Alberto Sánchez may refer to:

 Alberto Sánchez (canoeist) (born 1969), Spanish sprint canoer
 Alberto Sánchez (hammer thrower) (born 1973), Cuban hammer thrower
 Alberto Ruy Sánchez (born 1951), Mexican writer and editor